The Assizes of Antioch are a collection of numerous medieval legal treatises written in Old French (then Armenian) containing the law of the crusader Principality of Antioch and Armenian Kingdom of Cilicia. They were compiled in the thirteenth century.

References

Medieval legal codes
Medieval law
Customary legal systems
Legal treatises